Unhallowed is a 2003 album by The Black Dahlia Murder, and its title track.

Unhallowed may also refer to:

 That which is not hallowed

Music
 "Unhallowed", a song by Dissection from the 1995 album Storm of the Light's Bane
 "Unhallowed", a song by Rings of Saturn from the 2017 album Ultu Ulla
 "The Unhallowed", a song by Necrophobic from the 1999 album The Third Antichrist

Other uses
 Unhallowed, a play by Gerard McLarnon
 Unhallowed, an unpublished game in the Dangerous Journeys series

See also
 
 
 Unhallowed Ground (disambiguation)
 Hallow (disambiguation)